Old Franklin United Brethren Church, now known as Old Franklin United Methodist Church, is a historic United Brethren church located at Fairfield Township, Franklin County, Indiana.  It was built in 1831, and is a one-story, five bay, Federal style brick building.  It has a central cross gable at the vestibule topped by a bell tower and steeple added in 1910.  Surrounding the church on three sides is a cemetery with gravestones dating to the 1830s and 1840s.

It was listed on the National Register of Historic Places in 1995.

References

External links
Indiana Historic Markers: Old Franklin United Brethren Church

Methodist churches in Indiana
Churches on the National Register of Historic Places in Indiana
Federal architecture in Indiana
Churches completed in 1831
Buildings and structures in Franklin County, Indiana
National Register of Historic Places in Franklin County, Indiana